Article 15 of the European Convention on Human Rights allows contracting states to derogate from certain rights guaranteed by the Convention in a time of "war or other public emergency threatening the life of the nation".

Conditions
Permissible derogations under article 15 must meet three substantive conditions:

 there must be a public emergency threatening the life of the nation;
 any measures taken in response must be "strictly required by the exigencies of the situation"; and
 the measures taken in response to it must be in compliance with a state's other obligations under international law.

In addition to these substantive requirements, the derogation must be procedurally sound. There must be some formal announcement of the derogation and notice of the derogation and any measures adopted under it, and the ending of the derogation must be communicated to the Secretary-General of the Council of Europe.

As of 2016, eight member states had ever invoked derogations. The Court is quite permissive in accepting a state's derogations from the Convention but applies a higher degree of scrutiny in deciding whether measures taken by states under a derogation are, in the words of Article 15, "strictly required by the exigencies of the situation". Thus in A v United Kingdom, the Court dismissed a claim that a derogation lodged by the British government in response to the September 11 attacks was invalid, but went on to find that measures taken by the United Kingdom under that derogation were disproportionate.

In order for a derogation itself to be valid, the emergency giving rise to it must be:
 actual or imminent, although states do not have to wait for disasters to strike before taking preventive measures;
 involve the whole nation, although a threat confined to a particular region may be treated as "threatening the life of the nation" in that particular region;
 threaten the continuance of the organised life of the community;
 exceptional such that measures and restriction permitted by the Convention would be "plainly inadequate" to deal with the emergency.

Cases
Examples of such derogations include:
 In the 1969 Greek case, the European Commission of Human Rights ruled that the derogation was invalid because the alleged Communist subversion did not pose a sufficient threat. This is the only time to date that the Convention system has rejected an attempted derogation.
 Operation Demetrius—Internees arrested without trial pursuant to "Operation Demetrius" could not complain to the European Commission of Human Rights about breaches of Article 5 because on 27 June 1975, the UK lodged a notice with the Council of Europe declaring that there was a "public emergency within the meaning of Article 15(1) of the Convention".

Reception
The Court's permissive approach to emergencies has raised criticism in academic scholarship, arguing that it should give more scrutiny to the validity of derogations in order to prevent their use as an escape clause for human rights.

References

15
Emergency laws